Didier Joseph Louis Pironi (26 March 1952 – 23 August 1987) was a French racing driver. During his career, he competed in 72 Formula One World Championship Grands Prix, driving for Tyrrell (1978–1979), Ligier (1980) and Ferrari (1981–1982), but his F1 career ended after a practice crash at the 1982 German Grand Prix. He won the 24 Hours of Le Mans in 1978 driving a Renault Alpine A442B.

Early life
Pironi was born in Villecresnes, Val-de-Marne. He is the half brother and first cousin of José Dolhem (they had the same father and their mothers were sisters). He began studying as an engineer and earned a degree in science, but entering the family construction business fell by the wayside following his enrollment at the Winfield Racing School at Paul Ricard, graduating with a prestigious Volant Shell Competition Scholarship (free one Formula France season entry) as the best student of 1972.

Professional driving career (1972–1982)
The program was designed to promote young motorsport talents, that also led Alain Prost, René Arnoux and Patrick Tambay into Formula One. He became Formula France champion in 1974, taking the Super Renault championship title in 1976 and winning the prestigious Monaco Grand Prix Formula Three support race in 1977.

Tyrrell and Ligier
Pironi signed with Tyrrell and made his F1 debut at the Argentine GP on 15 January 1978. Ken Tyrrell's team which, despite being British, had a strong working relationship with Elf, dating back to the late 1960s. 

In the same year, Pironi was part of the massive Renault squad tasked with winning the 24 Hours of Le Mans. Partnering Jean-Pierre Jaussaud in the team's second car, the unusual "bubble roof" A442B, he won the race by four laps from the rival Porsche 936s.

Two seasons with the underfinanced Tyrrell team demonstrated enough promise for Guy Ligier to sign Pironi to his eponymous French team in 1980, a season in which Pironi recorded his first victory, in the Belgian Grand Prix at Zolder, as well as several podium finishes. The Ligier JS11/15 was an excellent car but was unable to reach its maximum potential. A combination of the team's incompetence and Laffite being in firm political control meant that Pironi was not going to win the championship with Ligier.

Ferrari
Pironi's performance piqued Enzo Ferrari's interest in the Frenchman's services, which he secured for 1981. Ferrari later recalled, "As soon as Pironi arrived at Maranello, he won everyone's admiration and affection, not only for his gifts as an athlete, but also for his way of doing things - he was reserved while at the same time outgoing."

Teamed and compared with Ferrari's lead driver Gilles Villeneuve, who welcomed the Frenchman and treated him as an equal, Pironi was slower in qualifying but steadier in races during his first season with Ferrari.

1982 San Marino Grand Prix
Establishing a fine rapport with the senior members of the team, Pironi arguably exploited this good relationship in the aftermath of the controversial 1982 San Marino race, where Pironi is widely thought to have duped Villeneuve into conceding victory by giving the impression that he would finish behind his teammate, only to unexpectedly power past him into the Tosa hairpin, despite the team having signaled both drivers to slow down. Villeneuve was furious with Pironi and vowed never to say another word to him. The Canadian was killed in qualifying two weeks later at the following Belgian Grand Prix at Zolder trying to beat Pironi's lap time. Many believe that this was foremost on Villeneuve's mind at the time of his fatal accident.

Harvey Postlethwaite (the co-designer of the 126C2) believed that the "drama" following San Marino was blown out of proportion by the press, "Villeneuve was really upset because he felt he should have been handed the race on a plate ... They were competitive and either of them could win."

He also mentioned a technical reason as to why the two Ferraris were swapping places so often during the San Marino race. "The (Ferrari 126C) turbo pressure was very, very difficult to control. Most of the reason that they were able to pass one another so evenly was that one would go through a sticky patch and sort of only be giving 4-bar of boost or 4.2, and the other would be getting a burst of 4.5, so it would have the legs of the other guy. It wasn't quite as spectacular as it appeared at the time."

According to Ferrari's chief mechanic Paolo Scaramelli, the team had agreed before the race that if the two Renaults were out, the drivers should have maintained position. Pironi did say a deal took place but the terms were more complex, "We had a meeting before the race; Arnoux, Prost, Gilles and me, in my motorhome. We agreed to make a spectacle for the first half of the race so long as our positions on the lap after half-distance were the same as on the grid. We started the real race at half-distance and so had plenty of fuel. The team (Ferrari) didn't know that, Marco Piccinini and Gérard Larrousse (Renault F1's team manager) didn't know, only the mechanics knew, but Prost and Arnoux - they will tell you the same." Pironi went on to add, "When I passed Villeneuve the first time, this was because he had made a mistake and had gone off the circuit. The first slow sign we got was a few laps after that, and by then we knew we had a lot of fuel left because of the way we drove the first half of the race."

In a 2002 interview with Motor Sport, Marco Piccinini supported Pironi's view, "It was a genuine misunderstanding triggered by Gilles making a mistake. He went off the circuit slightly and Didier passed. The sign was hung out because we were 1-2, not because we favored one driver over the other. We didn't favor either because it was at an early stage of the championship. We just wanted to maintain 1-2."

In 2007, former Marlboro marketing executive John Hogan (whose company sponsored Pironi in his time as a Ferrari driver) disputed the claim that Pironi had gone back on a prior arrangement with Villeneuve. He said: "I think Gilles was stunned somebody had out-driven him and that it just caught him so much by surprise."

With a fast, reliable car, Pironi appeared to be on course for being 1982 World Champion, but the Frenchman's own state of mind underwent severe stress due to several factors. Widespread antipathy by many in the F1 fraternity was directed toward him in the wake of the Zolder tragedy. There was also the rapid breakdown of his marriage to longtime girlfriend Catherine Beynie within weeks of the ceremony taking place. He observed first hand the death of Riccardo Paletti in the 1982 Canadian Grand Prix, the young Italian rookie ploughing into Pironi's stalled Ferrari on the starting grid.

Ferrari team members are reported to have observed changes in Pironi's behaviour throughout that summer following Villeneuve's death. Shortly before the 1982 British Grand Prix, Pironi remarked "I feel I am beginning to touch the World Championship."

1982 German Grand Prix
After claiming pole position for the German Grand Prix, Pironi was also busy testing a new-composition Goodyear rain tyre (under the guidance of Mauro Forghieri) in untimed practice. The "new-spec" Goodyear rain tyres proved to be very successful, with Pironi lapping up to 2.5 seconds faster than newly recruited teammate Patrick Tambay driving the sister Ferrari. (Pironi: 2 min 10.9 sec, Tambay: 2 min 13.4 sec)

Racing journalists at the circuit were quick to say Pironi was driving "like a madman." In defense of Pironi, Forghieri said that the substantial differences in the lap times between the two sets of Goodyears were no surprise to the team. The weather conditions at Hockenheim that weekend were highly uncertain; quickly alternating back and forth between wet and dry.

In the rain, one of the many problems caused by "ground effect" F1 cars was that the spray was forced out from under the side pods as a fine mist and virtually created a fog. To those behind, this made cars in front close to invisible.

When Pironi tried passing Derek Daly's Williams, the Ferrari 126C2 smashed into the back of Alain Prost's invisible Renault: a violent accident which bore some similarity to that suffered by Villeneuve. Pironi survived, but multiple fractures to both of his legs meant he never raced again in Formula 1. In the immediate aftermath of the accident, he said he felt no pain. "It was just like my accidents before, when I had no injuries. All I could think about was the car, that the spare one didn't work as well as this one, and that I would have to use it (the spare) for the race. Then I saw my legs and I thought maybe I wouldn't be doing this race, after all. In the helicopter, they began to hurt very seriously. But if I was to have this accident, it was lucky for me that it was in Germany and not in a more primitive place." The extent of Pironi's leg fractures was severe; however, contrary to Pironi's account of the accident, medics under the guidance of Professor Sid Watkins did not consider amputation in order to extricate him from the car.

At this point, he was leading with 39 points in the championship, ahead of Watson (30) and Keke Rosberg (27), but Pironi was relegated to runner-up as Rosberg passed him to become World Champion. Despite missing four races of that year's fourteen, Pironi lost the title to Rosberg by just 5 points.

In his Formula One career Didier Pironi won three races, achieved 13 podiums, and scored a total of 101 championship points. He also secured four pole positions.

Death
In 1986, after he was able to walk with both legs unaided, it looked as if Pironi would make a comeback when he tested for the French AGS team at Circuit Paul Ricard, and subsequently the Ligier JS27 at Dijon-Prenois. He proved that he was still fast enough to be competitive, but coming back to F1 was not truly practical due to the extent of his injuries. A return to F1 was further complicated by his insurance payout being based on the premise of sustaining career-ending injuries; Pironi would be required to pay the money back to his insurer should he return to the sport.

Pironi decided to turn to offshore powerboat racing instead. On 23 August 1987, Pironi was killed in an accident in the Needles Trophy Race near the Isle of Wight, that also took the life of his two crew members: journalist Bernard Giroux and his old friend Jean-Claude Guénard. Their boat, Colibri 4, rode over a rough wave caused by an oil tanker, causing the boat to flip over.

After Pironi's death, his girlfriend Catherine Goux gave birth to twins. In honour of Pironi and Gilles Villeneuve, she named them Didier and Gilles. In 2014, one of the twins, Gilles Pironi, joined Mercedes AMG Petronas as an engineer.
Gilles stood on the podium at the 2020 British Grand Prix, receiving the constructor's trophy.

Biographies
Lettre à Didier – Catherine Goux 
Didier: Dreams and Nightmares – Lorie Coffey, Jan Moller 
Didier Pironi: La flèche brisée (The Broken Arrow) – Martine Camus
Pironi: The Champion Who Never Was - David Sedgwick (e-book published 31 August 2017, paperback edition published 1 January 2018)

Racing record

Career summary

Complete Formula One results
(key) (Races in bold indicate pole position; races in italics indicate fastest lap)

References

Sources

External links

 Didier Pironi Memorial Web site
 Le site hommage a Didier Pironi(In French)

1952 births
1987 deaths
24 Hours of Le Mans drivers
24 Hours of Le Mans winning drivers
Atlantic Championship drivers
European Formula Two Championship drivers
Ferrari Formula One drivers
Formula One race winners
French Formula One drivers
French Formula Renault 2.0 drivers
French people of Italian descent
French racing drivers
Ligier Formula One drivers
Motorboat racers who died while racing
People from Villecresnes
Sport deaths in England
Tyrrell Formula One drivers
World Sportscar Championship drivers
Sportspeople from Val-de-Marne
Oreca drivers
BMW M drivers